Abend is a German-language surname, meaning "evening". Notable people with the surname include:

Edward Abend, (1822–1904), German American politician
Guy Abend (born 1990), Israeli footballer
Harry Abend (1937–2021), Venezuelan artist

See also

Am Abend, 1910 German silent film
Stewart v. Abend, United States Supreme Court case

Surnames from nicknames
German-language surnames